The initialism IES may refer to:

Government organizations
 Indian Economic Service
 Indian Education Service, in British India
 Institute for Environment and Sustainability of the European Commission
 Institute of Education Sciences of the U.S. Department of Education

Non-profit organizations
 Institute for the International Education of Students
 Illuminating Engineering Society
 International Enterprise Singapore
 International Society of Endocrinology
 Israel Endocrine Society
 Israel Exploration Society
 Institution of Environmental Sciences

Companies
 IES Ltd (Integrated Export Systems), a transportation software company
 Integrated Electrical Services
 Internationella Engelska Skolan

Other
 Indian Engineering Services
 Integrated Encryption Scheme, in cryptography, a public key cryptosystem
 Intertemporal elasticity of substitution